Anthia andersoni is a species of ground beetle in the subfamily Anthiinae. It was described by Maximilien Chaudoir in 1861.

References

Anthiinae (beetle)
Beetles described in 1861